Joan Olivé Márquez (born 22 November 1984 in Tarragona, Catalonia, Spain) is a former professional Grand Prix motorcycle road racer. He has competed in the 125cc, 250cc, Moto2 and Moto3 World championships since he started to race professionally in the 2001 Grand Prix motorcycle racing season. After retiring from racing, he became the test/replacement rider for KTM's Moto3 project. In early 2019, Olivé was appointed team manager of the Marc VDS Racing team.

Grand Prix motorcycle racing career

Races by year
(key) (Races in bold indicate pole position, races in italics indicate fastest lap)

References

External links

1984 births
Living people
Sportspeople from Tarragona
Spanish motorcycle racers
Motorcycle racers from Catalonia
125cc World Championship riders
250cc World Championship riders
Moto2 World Championship riders
Moto3 World Championship riders